Marshall High School is a high school in the Marshall Public Schools District in Marshall, Michigan.

Athletics
The Marshall Redhawks competes in the Interstate 8 Athletic Conference. The school colors are red and black.  The following Michigan High School Athletic Association (MHSAA) sanctioned sports are offered:

Baseball (boys)
Basketball (girls and boys)
Boys state champion - 1944
Girls state champion - 2016
Bowling (girls and boys)
Cross country (girls and boys)
Boys state champion - 1981
Football (boys)
State champion - 1996, 2009
Golf (girls and boys)
Boys state champion - 1968, 1996
Soccer (girls and boys)
Softball (girls)
Swim and dive (girls and boys)
Tennis (girls and boys)
Track (girls and boys)
Volleyball (girls)
Wrestling (boys)

References

External links

School district

Public high schools in Michigan
Educational institutions established in 1972
Schools in Calhoun County, Michigan
1972 establishments in Michigan